Lu Tan (February 23, 1932 – December 3, 2014) was a Chinese astrophysicist, who was a member of the Chinese Academy of Sciences.

References 

1932 births
2014 deaths
Members of the Chinese Academy of Sciences